

The Pottier P.80 is a single-seat, single-engine sport aircraft developed in France in the late 1970s and marketed for homebuilding. Ultimately based on the P.70 design, it features a redesigned wing and cockpit canopy. The P.80 is a low-wing cantilever monoplane of conventional design with an enclosed cockpit. Construction throughout is of metal. The prototype was constructed and unveiled at the 1977 Paris Air Show.

Just as the P.70 had led to the two-seat P.170, Pottier also created a two-seat version of the P.80, but with its seats side-by-side instead of in tandem as those of the P.170 had been. This was designated the P.180, and by 1987, at least 13 examples had flown.

Variants
 P.80S - single-seat version
 P.180S - two-seat version

Specifications (P.80S)

Notes

References

 
 

1970s French sport aircraft
P.080
Homebuilt aircraft
Low-wing aircraft
Single-engined tractor aircraft